Dubai Cultural Sports Club was a football club based in Dubai in the United Arab Emirates.

In 2017 merged with Al Shabab to join Al-Ahli to rebrand the club into Shabab Al-Ahli Dubai FC.

History
The club was relegated in 2007 to the UAE Second Division and played three years in the league, before returning in 2010 to the UAE League. Dubai CSC were to play Nottingham Forest in a pre-season friendly on 11 July 2013, the first time that they will have hosted a European club. The stadium has been recently refurbished and has full air conditioning.

Achievements
 First Division League: 2003–04
 UAE Vice Presidents Cup: 2009–10

Managers
 Junior dos Santos (October 2010–July 11)
 Néstor Clausen (15 July 2011 – 20 September 2011)
 Umberto Barberis (caretaker) (2 September 2011 – 1 October 2011)
 Marin Ion (3 October 2011 – 12 December 2011)
 Ayman Al-Ramadi (21 December 2011 – 1 June 2012)
 René Marsiglia (1 July 2012 – 30 June 2013)
 Martin Rueda (20 July 2013 – 5 November 2013)
 Umberto Barberis (5 November 2013–?)
 Chiheb Ellili (July 2014 – March 2015) 
 Marin Ion (April 2015 – December 2015)
 Guglielmo Arena ( 1 July 2016 – 26 November 2016)
 Hany Ramzy (26 November 2016 – 16 May 2017)

References

External links
 Official site

 
Football clubs in Dubai
Association football clubs established in 1996
Dubai
1996 establishments in the United Arab Emirates
Association football clubs disestablished in 2017
Defunct football clubs in the United Arab Emirates